The 1906 Oregon Webfoots football team represented the University of Oregon in the 1906 college football season. It was the Webfoots' 13th season; they competed as an independent and were led by head coach Hugo Bezdek. They finished the season with a record of five wins, zero losses and one tie (5–0–1).

Schedule

References

Oregon
Oregon Ducks football seasons
College football undefeated seasons
Oregon Webfoots football